Chain Lake is a lake in Chisago County, Minnesota, in the United States.

Chain Lake was named from the resemblance of its outline and other nearby lakes to links of a chain.

See also
List of lakes in Minnesota

References

Lakes of Minnesota
Lakes of Chisago County, Minnesota